David Ditchburn is a Scottish historian.  He is a senior lecturer at Trinity College Dublin.

Publications
Aberdeen before 1800: A New History, East Linton: Tuckwell Press, 2002 [co-edited with Patricia Dennison and Michael Lynch, Edinburgh]  
Scotland and Europe: The Medieval Kingdom and its Contacts with Christendom, c.1215-1545. Volume 1: Religion, Culture and Commerce. East Linton: Tuckwell Press, 2001. .
Freedom and Authority: Scotland, c.1050-1650. East Linton: Tuckwell Press, 2000. [co-edited with Terry Brotherstone, Aberdeen] 
Atlas of Medieval Europe. London: Routledge, 1997. [co-edited with Angus Mackay, Edinburgh]   Also published in Spanish edition as Atlas de Europa Medieval, Madrid: Cátedra, 1999 
'Medieval Scotland, 1100-1560', in R.A. Houston and W. Knox (eds.), The New Penguin History of Scotland. London: Penguin, 2001. [with Alastair J Macdonald, Aberdeen]

External links
 Dr. Ditchburn's University Home Page

Living people
Historians of Scotland
Academics of Trinity College Dublin
Year of birth missing (living people)
20th-century Scottish historians
21st-century Scottish historians